The  was an earthquake of magnitude 6.4  which struck primarily the Hokuriku region in Japan on 18 June 2019 at 22:22 JST (13:22 UTC). The epicenter was close to the city of Tsuruoka, Yamagata. A tsunami warning was also issued.

Geology

The northwestern side of Honshu lies on the southeastern margin of the Sea of Japan, an area of oceanic crust created by back-arc spreading from the late Oligocene to middle Miocene. The extensional tectonics associated with the spreading formed a series of N-S trending extensional faults and associated basins. The crust in this area is subjected to east–west compression associated with the convergent boundary between the Amur Plate and the Okhotsk Plate. As a result of this strain, the north–south trending extensional faults are reactivated in a reverse sense. The 1964 Niigata earthquake, the 1983 Sea of Japan earthquake, and the 1993 Hokkaidō earthquake were all a result of similar processes.

Damage and effects
The magnitude 6.4 earthquake triggered a tsunami advisory for three prefectures in Japan. A tsunami with a height of 10 cm was reported in Niigata. The earthquake damaged a total of 149 homes in Akita, Niigata, and Yamagata prefectures.

Casualties
Twenty-six people were reported to be injured, mostly by fallen debris.

Transportation
Sections of the Nihonkai-Tōhoku Expressway and Yamagata Expressway were closed by the East Nippon Expressway Company. National Route 345 was blocked by fallen debris in Murakami.

Utilities
Tohoku Electric Power announced that a blackout occurred in parts of Yamagata and Niigata prefectures because of the earthquake, with 1000 customers impacted in Tsuruoka and 200 customers impacted in Sakata. As a safety precaution, gas services were interrupted in Niigata Prefecture.

Seismic intensity

This chart describes the maximum perceived shaking using the Japan Meteorological Agency seismic intensity scale, or Shindo scale, for the earthquake throughout the impacted area.

See also
2018 Hokkaido Eastern Iburi earthquake

References
Explanatory notes

Citations

External links
 

2019 earthquakes
History of Niigata Prefecture
History of Yamagata Prefecture
June 2019 events in Japan
Earthquakes of the Reiwa period
2019 disasters in Japan